Byun Woong  (born 7 May 1986) is a South Korean footballer who plays as a midfielder for Chungju Hummel.

External links 

1986 births
Living people
Association football midfielders
South Korean footballers
Ulsan Hyundai FC players
Gimcheon Sangmu FC players
K League 1 players
Korea National League players
K League 2 players